Susan or Sue Weber may refer to:

 Sue Weber (born 1986), American soccer defender
 Susan Weber (historian) (born 1954), American historian

See also
Susan Webber (disambiguation)